The 2016–17 Troy Trojans women's basketball team represented Troy University during the 2016–17 NCAA Division I women's basketball season. The Trojans, led by fifth year head coach Chanda Rigby, played their home games at Trojan Arena and were members of the Sun Belt Conference. They finished the season 22–11, 12–6 in Sun Belt play to finish in third place. They defeat Arkansas State, Texas–Arlington and Louisiana–Lafayette to become champions of the Sun Belt Tournament to earn an automatic trip to the NCAA women's tournament. They lost in the first round to Mississippi State.

Roster

Schedule

|-
!colspan=9 style="background:#960018; color:white;"|  Exhibition

|-
!colspan=9 style="background:#960018; color:white;"| Non-conference regular season

|-
!colspan=9 style="background:#960018; color:white;"| Sun Belt regular season

|-
!colspan=9 style="background:#960018; color:white;"| Sun Belt Women's Tournament

|-
!colspan=9 style="background:#960018; color:white;"| NCAA Women's Tournament

See also
 2016–17 Troy Trojans men's basketball team

References

Troy Trojans women's basketball seasons
Troy
Troy